Richard Henry Green (1833-1877) was the first African American to graduate from Yale University and a schoolteacher and physician. During the American Civil War, he served as an acting assistant surgeon in the United States Navy.

Green was born in New Haven, Connecticut, to Richard Green, a bootmaker who worked and lived some four blocks from the Yale campus, near the corner of State and Chapel Streets. The elder Green helped establish St. Luke’s Episcopal Church, an African American church on nearby Park Street.

To prepare for admission, Green studied Latin, Greek, and mathematics with Lucius Wooster Fitch, an 1840 graduate of Yale and a son of the Yale College pastor. He entered Yale in 1853, and later joined the literary society Brothers in Unity and the Sigma Delta fraternity. He graduated with a bachelor of arts degree in 1857.

After graduating, Green taught school in Milford, Connecticut, and after a year and a half took a teaching job at the Bennington Seminary in Bennington, Vermont. 

Two years into the American Civil War, in November 1863, Green entered the U.S. Navy as an acting assistant surgeon. According to an 1877 letter from his father to the Yale secretary, Green "was sent to the U.S. Steamer State of Georgia blockading off N. Carolina under Admiral Porter. He was on that vessel about a Year, when she was taken out of commission, and he was put on waiting order 3 weeks. During that time he was married to Miss Charlotte Caldwell of Bennington, VT. Then he was ordered to the Steamer Seneca and was at the taking of Fort Fisher, & the other fortifications in the Cape Fear river."

Meanwhile, he studied medicine at Dartmouth College, where he received an MD in 1864.

After the war, Green and his wife moved to Hoosick, New York, where he practiced medicine and apparently changed the spelling of his surname to Greene. 

"He was fond of the study of natural history and spent much time collecting plants and objects of interest in that department. He was a most amiable and genial man, and a practical Christian. He was a member of the County Medical society since 1872", according to an 1897 book, Landmarks of Rensselaer County, New York.  

Greene died in Hoosick on March 23, 1877, “of disease of the heart leaving a wife & daughter”, according to his father's letter.

Notes

External links
Richard Henry Green papers at Yale
Green's Yale obituary

1833 births
1877 deaths
Yale College alumni
African-American United States Navy personnel
Union Navy surgeons